The Civil Aviation Authority of Malaysia (Abbreviation: CAAM, Malay: Pihak Berkuasa Penerbangan Awam Malaysia), previously known as the Department of Civil Aviation (Abbreviation: DCA, Malay: Jabatan Penerbangan Awam), is a government agency that was formed under the Ministry of Transport Malaysia in 1969. Effectively on 19 February 2018, DCA was incorporated into a statutory body known as CAAM.

The incorporation of CAAM is in line with the requirement of the International Civil Aviation Organization (ICAO) which has called upon contracting states to the Chicago Convention to establish an autonomous civil aviation authority to ensure efficient management of the safety and security of the civil aviation. Under this new umbrella, CAAM is making great strides to strengthen the nation’s aviation standards as well as addressing existing challenges, to advance Malaysia in the aviation sector in line with the country’s aspiration to be the leading hub for the industry regionally as well as globally.

The regulatory responsibility of civil aviation technical matters is vested in CAAM. CAAM’s main role is to contribute to the development of Malaysia’s civil aviation technical sector and mandated to comply with ICAO’s standards so as to keep aviation safe, secure and efficient.

Malaysia has been a proud Council member of ICAO from 2007 and has since maintained its membership in the Council for three consecutive terms while making significant contributions to the development of civil aviation’s safety and security.

Overview
 The transformation of the Department of Civil Aviation into a Civil Aviation Authority was to better regulate, facilitate and promote the nation’s aviation/aerospace industry. The revamp is to allow for more flexibility in the training and hiring of qualified technical personnel to ensure that the national and international obligations of Malaysia in matters relating to civil aviation can be carried out, and the universal safety and security standards and requirements in civil aviation are implemented, complied with and well-maintained. The establishment of CAAM is also to ensure affairs involving Malaysia’s civil aviation industry meet the safety standards and procedures recommended by ICAO.  
 CAAM establishes a comprehensive policy covering all key aspects of aviation, focusing on growth areas, strategic development objectives, long-term strategies and transformational approaches. One of CAAM’s vital role is maintaining the country’s competitive edge within the global aviation sector. As a regulatory body, CAAM’s responsibilities include safeguarding civil aviation operations in Malaysia; exercise safety regulatory oversight of civil aviation; regulate the operation of aerodrome services and facilities in Malaysia; provide air navigation services within the Kuala Lumpur and Kota Kinabalu Flight Information Region; coordinate search and rescue operations; as well as cooperate with any authority in charge with investigation of aircraft accident and serious incident.  
 Beyond the regulatory and oversight functions, CAAM also encourage; promote; facilitate; and assist in the development and improvement of civil aviation capabilities, skills and services in Malaysia by providing technical and consultancy services relating to civil aviation, as well as providing education and training in this industry and promoting research and development of civil aviation sector.  
 One major development that CAAM has been the working on is online services. CAAM is mandated to provide better customer service which seeks to provide one centralised system to process applications and approvals for licence and certificate.  
 In term of environment, CAAM has been working with the Government and stakeholders to minimise environmental impact due to aviation activities. On this note, CAAM has given its agreement to ICAO on the implementation of Carbon Offsetting and Reduction Scheme for International Aviation (CORSIA).  
 With regards to air traffic services, CAAM is currently at the final stage of the construction of a new Kuala Lumpur Air Traffic Control Centre Complex (KLATCC) which is estimated to be complete in 2021. The new KLATCC Complex, located near to Kuala Lumpur International Airport (KLIA) in Sepang, Selangor, will be a new landmark in the country’s civil aviation industry. The RM650 million complex will house the air traffic control operations for the Kuala Lumpur Flight Information Region (KL FIR), becoming the backbone of the country’s air traffic control as well as the central coordination center for CAAM’s Search and Rescue (SAR) system. The new KLATCC will provide more efficient and seamless air traffic control operations, enhancement of KL FIR Airspace Surveillance System, improvement of KL FIR Airspace Navigation System to enable Performance Based Navigation (PBN) implementation and would allow more aircraft to land during peak hours or premium slots, increasing the landing capacity at KLIA from 78 to 108 aircraft per hour, which is among the highest in the world.

Divisions
CAAM consists of the following divisions:
 Quality and Standards
 Flight Operations
 Aviation Security
 Air Navigation Services     Standards
 Airworthiness
 Aerodrome Standards
 Malaysia Aviation Academy
 Flight Calibration
 Air Traffic Management
 CAAM Regional Office
 Peninsular
 Sabah
 Sarawak
 Management Services
 Finance Management
 Legal Advisor
 Integrity
 Corporate Communication

References

External links

 
 History of the Civil Aviation Authority of Malaysia
 Flight Information Region In Malaysia	

Federal ministries, departments and agencies of Malaysia
Malaysia
Ministry of Transport (Malaysia)
1969 establishments in Malaysia
Government agencies established in 1969
Civil aviation in Malaysia